In C is an album by Acid Mothers Temple & The Melting Paraiso U.F.O., released in 2001 by Eclipse Records as a vinyl record and in 2002 by Squealer Music on CD. The Squealer release contains a bonus track. The title track is a performance of the Terry Riley piece of the same name.

A follow-up album, titled In 0 to ∞, was released in 2010.

Reception

In C made Pitchfork Media's "Top 50 Albums of 2002," at #45.

Track listing

Personnel
Personnel as listed on Acid Mothers website.

 Cotton Casino - voice
 Tsuyama Atsushi - monster bass, voice
 Higashi Hiroshi - electric guitar, synthesizer
 Ichiraku Yoshimitsu - drums
 Kawabata Makoto - electric guitars, violin, zuruna, synthesizer, tambura, sruthi box

Additional personnel
 Terukina Noriko - vibraphone, glockenspiel

Technical personnel

 Kawabata Makoto - Production and Engineering
 Sachiko@ELF design - Artwork
 Willam Lazorchak - Artwork
 Ishida Yoko - Cover Photo
 Yoshida Tatsuya - Stonehenge Photo

References

Acid Mothers Temple albums
2001 albums